Saidapettai ( Syedabad is a dead municipality which is annexed to Chennai in the year 1946.
It was the district headquarters of the erstwhile  Chingleput District from 1801 to 1904.

History
Saidapet is a former municipality that comprised the villages of Adyar, Mambalam, Kodambakkam, Puliyur, Saali Garamam, and Teynampet. T. Nagar, the major business hub of Chennai, was once part of Saidapet municipality. All of Saidapet Municipal Council was annexed to the town of St. George in 1946.

After the annexation of Saidapet, Madras municipality became a city.

Demographics

References 

Chinglepet district